Frank Edward Huntingdon Guthrie (3 November 1869 – 19 June 1954) was an England born South African international rugby union half-back.

Biography
Although born in Notting Hill, London, Guthrie was educated at Diocesan College in Cape Town, where he also played provincial rugby for Western Province. He made his first appearance for South Africa in the 1st Test of Great Britain's 1891 tour, South Africa's first as a Test nation. He was not selected to play in the 2nd Test, but returned to the side for the 3rd match at Newlands Stadium, where Great Britain won to seal a 3–0 series victory. His final match for South Africa was the 1st Test of Great Britain's 1896 tour, an 8–0 South Africa loss. Guthrie died in 1954, in Pietermaritzburg, at the age of 84.

Test history

See also
 List of South Africa national rugby union players – Springbok no. 5

References

1869 births
1954 deaths
Alumni of Diocesan College, Cape Town
English emigrants to South Africa
Rugby union players from Notting Hill
South Africa international rugby union players
Villager FC players